The 1948–49 FAW Welsh Cup is the 62nd season of the annual knockout tournament for competitive football teams in Wales.

Key
League name pointed after clubs name.
CCL - Cheshire County League
FL D2 - Football League Second Division
FL D3N - Football League Third Division North
FL D3S - Football League Third Division South
SFL - Southern Football League

Fifth round
Eight winners from the Fourth round and ten new clubs.

Sixth round
Two winners from the Fifth round. Seven other clubs get a bye to the Seventh round.

Seventh round
One winner from the Sixth round plus seven clubs who get a bye in the previous round.

Semifinal
Swansea Town and Rhyl played at Wrexham, Cardiff City and Merthyr Tydfil played at Swansea.

Final
Final were held at Cardiff.

External links
The FAW Welsh Cup

1948-49
Wales
Cup